An international decoration is a military award which is not bestowed by a particular country, but rather by an international organization such as the United Nations or NATO. Such awards are normally issued as service medals, for participation in various international military operations, and not for specific acts of heroism or bravery.

The following is a list of the most commonly recognized international military decorations:

United Nations
  UNKorea United Nations Korea Medal
  UNTSO – United Nations Truce Supervision Organization – Medal
  UNOGIL – Observation Group in Lebanon
  UNMOGIP – Military Observer Group in India and Pakistan
  UNOC – Congo
  UNTEA – Temporary Executive Authority
  UNYOM – Yemen Observer Mission
  UNFICYP – Cyprus
  UNEFME – Emergency Force, Middle East – also known as UNEF II
  UNDOF – Disengagement Observer Force
  UNIFIL – Interim Force in Lebanon
  UNIIMOG – Iran/Iraq Military Observers Group
  UNTAG – Transition Assistance Group
  ONUCA – Observer Group in Central America
  UNIKOM – Iraq-Kuwait Observation Mission
  UNAVEM – Angola Verification Mission I, II & III
  MINURSO – Mission for the Referendum in Western Sahara
  ONUSAL – Observer Mission in El Salvador
  UNPROFOR – Protection Force
  UNMOP – Mission of Observers in Prevlaka
  UNTAES – Transitional Admin for Eastern Slavonia, Baranja & West Sirmium
  MINUGUA – Mision de las Naciones Unidas en Guatemala
  MINURCA – Verification Mission in the Central African Republic
  UNMIK – Mission in Kosovo
  UNOMSIL – Observer Mission In Sierra Leone
  UNPREDEP – Preventive Deployment Force
  UNMONUC – Congo 2000 –
  UNMEE – Mission in Ethiopia and Eritrea
  UNSSM – Special Service Medal
  UNHQ – Headquarters New York
  UNMIS – Mission in Sudan
  UNPSG – Police Support Group
  UNTAET – Transitional Administration In East Timor
  UNAMET – Assistance Mission East Timor
  UNMISET – Mission of Support in East Timor
  UNONUB – Operation in Burundi
  UNMIT – Mission in Timor
  UNAMID – African Union Mission in Darfur
  MINURCAT – Mission in the Central African Republic and Chad
  MONUSCO – United Nations Organization Stabilization Mission in the Democratic Republic of the Congo
  UNISFA – United Nations Interim Security Force for Abyei
  UNMISS – United Nations Mission in South Sudan

North Atlantic Treaty Organisation
 NATO Meritorious Service Medal
  Yugoslavia service medal
  Kosovo service
 Macedonia Medal
  Operation Eagle Assist service (Article 5)
  Operation Active Endeavor service (Article 5)
  Operations in the Balkans
  Afghanistan service (Non-Article 5)
 Serge Lazareff Prize

European Union

  Western European Union Mission Service Medal
  European Community Monitor Mission Medal for Yugoslavia
  European Union Monitoring Mission Medal for Yugoslavia
  Eurofor – European Force Service Medal
  European Police College – Civil Crisis Management
  Common Security and Defence Policy Service Medal (CSDP), for Staff Service (Always worn with operation clasp)
 CSDP Medal for the Police Mission in Bosnia and Herzegovina (EUPM)
 CSDP Medal for EUFOR Concordia
 CSDP Medal for Operation Artemis
 CSDP Medal for the Police Mission in the former Yugoslav Republic of Macedonia (EUPOL Proxima)
 CSDP Medal for EUFOR Althea
 CSDP Medal for the Reform Mission in the Democratic Republic of the Congo (EUSEC RD Congo)
 CSDP Medal for AMIS EU Supporting Action
 CSDP Medal for the Border Assistance Mission for the Rafah Crossing Point (EUBAM Rafah)
 CSDP Medal for the Coordinating Office for Palestinian Police Support (EUPOL COPPS)
 CSDP Medal for EUFOR RD Congo
 CSDP Medal for the Police Mission to Afghanistan (EUPOL Afghanistan)
 CSDP Medal for the Bridging Operation in Chad and the Central African Republic (EUFOR Tchad/RCA)
 CSDP Medal for EU Naval Operation Atalanta
 CSDP Medal for Rule of Law Mission in Kosovo (EULEX Kosovo)
 European Union Somalia Training Mission (EUTM Somalia)
 European Union Regional Maritime Capacity Building for the Horn of Africa and the Western Indian Ocean (EUCAP NESTOR), 16 July 2012 –
 EUTM Mali, January 2013–
 European Union Aviation Security Mission in South Sudan (EUAVSEC SOUTH SUDAN), February 2013 – January 2014
 EUFOR RCA, April 2014–
  CSDP EUTM MALI Medal for Extraordinary Meritorious Service ribbon bar

International Control Commission
  International Commission for Supervision and Control Medal

International Commission of Control and Supervision
  International Commission of Control and Supervision Medal (first version)
  International Commission of Control and Supervision Medal (second version)

Organization of American States
 Inter-American Peace Force Medal
  Inter-American Defense Board Medal

System of Cooperation Among the American Air Forces
  SICOFAA Legion of Merit Gentleman
  SICOFAA Legion of Merit Officer
  SICOFAA Legion of Merit Grand Cross

Multinational Force and Observers
  Multinational Force & Observers Medal
  Multinational Force and Observers Civilian Medal
  Multinational Force and Observers Director General's Award

References

Military awards and decorations